The Parinacochas Province is a province located in the Ayacucho Region of Peru. It is one of the eleven that make up that region. The province has a population of 24,028 inhabitants as of 2002. The capital of the province is Coracora.

Boundaries
North: Apurímac Region
East: Paucar del Sara Sara Province
South: Arequipa Region
West: Lucanas Province

Geography 
Other mountains are listed below:

Political division

Coracora
Chumpi
Coronel Castañeda
Pacapausa
Pullo
Puyusca
San Francisco de Ravacayco
Upahuacho

Ethnic groups 
The people in the province are mainly indigenous citizens of Quechua descent. Quechua is the language which the majority of the population (54.94%) learnt to speak in childhood, 44.60% of the residents started speaking using the Spanish language (2007 Peru Census).

See also
 Inka Wasi
 Parinaqucha
 Parququcha
 Tipiqucha

Sources 

Provinces of the Ayacucho Region